The Metropolitan Courthouse is a courthouse in downtown Albuquerque, New Mexico, housing the Bernalillo County Metropolitan Court. The building is located on the northwest corner of 4th Street and Lomas Boulevard in an area known as the Courthouse District. The courthouse rises  and has nine stories. Designed by DCSW Architects in a contemporary Art Deco style, it features a three-story rotunda finished with granite, marble, and travertine and a  sculpture of the scales of justice.

Ground was broken on the project in May 2001 and the building was topped out the following June. The courthouse opened for business on January 20, 2004, replacing the old Metro Courthouse at 4th and Roma.

From 2005 to 2009, the Metro Courthouse was at the center of a high-profile fraud investigation, during which allegations emerged that a group of conspirators had siphoned off $4.2 million from the courthouse construction project in a scheme described by the Albuquerque Journal as "breathtaking in scope and star power." Eight people were eventually named as defendants in the case, including the former president pro tempore of the New Mexico State Senate and a former mayor of Albuquerque. The investigation ended with six of the accused pleading guilty to conspiracy and mail fraud, while the other two pleaded guilty to misprision of felony.

See also
 List of tallest buildings in Albuquerque

References

External links 
Metropolitan Courthouse (Emporis)

Skyscraper office buildings in Albuquerque, New Mexico
Courthouses in New Mexico
Government buildings completed in 2003
2003 establishments in New Mexico